Drogmi (Drogmi Lotsāwa Śākya Yeshe) (c. 992-1064) transmitted the trantric system "Path and Fruit" (Lamdré) which came to be the central esoteric tradition of the Sakya school of Tibetan Buddhism. Drogmi was a famous scholar and translator who had studied at the Vikramashila monastery directly under Naropa, Ratnākaraśānti, Vagishvakirti and other great panditas from India for twelve years. He is famous for his beard.

References

Sakya Buddhists
Tibetan Buddhism
Monks of Vikramashila